This is a list of schools in the Clark County School District located in Clark County, Nevada.

Elementary schools (K-5)

Middle schools (6-8)

High schools (9-12)

Other types of schools

References

External links
 The Clark County School District Archive Committee documents the history of CCSD schools.
Schools Directory documents the regions each school lies in.

Clark County